Valrubicin (N-trifluoroacetyladriamycin-14-valerate, trade name Valstar) is a chemotherapy drug used to treat bladder cancer. Valrubicin is a semisynthetic analog of the anthracycline doxorubicin, and is administered by infusion directly into the bladder.

It was originally launched as Valstar in the U.S. in 1999 for intravesical therapy of Bacille Calmette-Guérin (BCG)-refractory carcinoma in situ of the urinary bladder in patients in whom cystectomy would be associated with unacceptable morbidity or mortality; however, it was voluntarily withdrawn in 2002 due to manufacturing issues. Valstar was relaunched on September 3, 2009.

Side effects
Blood in urine
Incontinence
painful or difficult urination
Unusually frequent urination

References

Anthracyclines
Topoisomerase inhibitors
Trifluoromethyl compounds
Acetamides
Withdrawn drugs